A super-complaint is a complaint made in the UK by a state-approved "super-complainant"/watchdog organisation on behalf of consumers, which was fast-tracked to a higher authority such as the Office of Fair Trading (prior to its dissolution on 1 April 2014). The official body now in charge of general consumer protection super-complaints is the Competition and Markets Authority.

A super-complaint, as defined in section 11(1) of the UK's Enterprise Act 2002, is a complaint submitted by a designated consumer body that "any feature, or combination of features, of a market in the UK for goods or services is or appears to be significantly harming the interests of consumers".

Some of the super-complainants under the Office of Fair Trading scheme were:

 Which?
 National Consumer Council
 Citizens Advice
 Energywatch
 Consumer Council for Water (formerly known as Watervoice)
 Postwatch
 Campaign for Real Ale
 General Consumer Council for Northern Ireland

What Car? magazine also applied, but was rejected.

Super-complaints have also specifically been introduced for the financial markets in the UK under the aegis of the Financial Conduct Authority (FCA). The Financial Services and Markets Act 2000 (FSMA) provides that certain consumer bodies may complain to the FCA about features of a market for financial services in the UK that may be significantly damaging the interests of consumers. The Government first issued guidance for bodies seeking designation as super complainants and then received and ultimately approved the newly appointed bodies which can make super-complaints to the FCA: the General Consumer Council for Northern Ireland, Citizens Advice, the Federation of Small Businesses, and Which?.

In December 2018, a super-complaint was made against the police forces of England and Wales on behalf of victims and witnesses of crime who had had their data secretly shared with immigration authorities.

See also

References 

Law of the United Kingdom